Peter Gojowczyk won the title, beating Farrukh Dustov 7–6(7–2), 6–3.

Seeds

Draw

Finals

Top half

Bottom half

References
 Main Draw
 Qualifying Draw

Slovak Open - Singles
2014 Singles